Peter Chilvers was an inventor, engineer and promoter of sailing and windsurfing.  He is credited with an early version of a sail powered surfboard. He died from lung cancer on 26 February 2015.

Life

Chilvers had been an engineer for Lotus and founded a sailing and windsurfing centre in London. Chilvers is credited with creating a crude sailing craft propelled by a free-sail system while living on Hayling Island in 1958. His craft was recognized as prior art in later court cases in England regarding sailboard patents and royalties.

The windsurfing centre in London's East End was founded by Chilvers as a philanthropic venture to promote sailing and windsurfing amongst underprivileged children of the East End in the 1970s. He created and maintained the centre for over 25 years.

Chilvers headed the bid for a £40 million sailing and windsurfing centre on Hayling Island to regenerate the area and recognise it as the place where Windsurfing was invented and where he grew up.

Claim of previous invention in windsurfing patent case
Chilvers came into the public eye in the 1980s as the result of patent infringement lawsuit brought by Windsurfing International, Inc. against Tabur Marine, a competing manufacturer. Tabur disputed the validity of the patent, and presented to the courts evidence of a creation by Chilvers, who, in 1958, on Hayling Island, assembled a board powered by a freesail system 10 years before Windsurfing International filed for its patent for the Windsurfer. Although the Chilvers Sailboard  differed in some respects from the Windsurfer it had all the elements of a modern Windsurfer. The court ruled for Tabur. This case set important precedents for patent law in the United Kingdom, originating the well-known Windsurfer Test regarding the steps of inventiveness and non-obviousness.

The case, Chilvers, Hayling, and a replica of Chilvers' original board, were featured on an episode of The One Show in 2009.

See also
 Destination Hayling Island More information on the proposed redevelopment of Hayling Island that Peter Chilvers headed.

References

English inventors
English windsurfers
English philanthropists
2015 deaths
Year of birth missing
20th-century British engineers